The 1908 Svenska Mästerskapet Final was played on 11 October 1908 between the first-time finalists IFK Göteborg and the second-time finalists IFK Uppsala. The match decided the winner of 1908 Svenska Mästerskapet, the football cup to determine the Swedish champions. IFK Göteborg won their first ever title with a 4–3 victory.

Route to the final

IFK Göteborg 

IFK Göteborg entered in a preliminary round away-game against IFK Eskilstuna on 23 August 1908 and won, 5–2. On 13 September 1908, IFK Göteborg played an away-game quarter-final in Malmö against Malmö BoIS that ended in a draw 3–3, which also was the result after extra time. The home-game replay one week later, on 20 September 1908, IFK Göteborg won, 5–2. On 4 October 1908, IFK Göteborg played the semi-final against IK Sleipner and won 10–0 at home.

IFK Göteborg made their first Svenska Mästerskapet final.

IFK Uppsala 

In the preliminary round, IFK Uppsala won the away-game against Sandvikens AIK on 23 August 1908 with 3–2 in Sandviken. IFK Uppsala won the quarter-final against Djurgårdens IF, 4–1, at home on 13 September 1908. On 4 October 1908, IFK Uppsala won the away-game kamratmöte semi-final against IFK Stockholm, 3–2 after extra time.

IFK Uppsala made their second Svenska Mästerskapet final after having lost the previous final to Örgryte IS.

Match details

References 

Print

1908
1908 in Swedish football
IFK Göteborg matches
October 1908 sports events
IFK Uppsala Fotboll matches